Bachir Mouhamed Mané (born 20 December 1997) is a Senegalese football player. He plays for Italian Serie D club Fano.

Club career
He made his Serie C debut for Fermana on 27 August 2017 in a game against Ravenna.

On 1 August 2019, he returned to Fermana on loan.

His contract with Carpi was terminated by mutual consent on 24 September 2020.

References

External links
 

1997 births
Footballers from Dakar
Living people
Senegalese footballers
Association football midfielders
Fermana F.C. players
A.C. Gozzano players
Alma Juventus Fano 1906 players
Serie C players
Serie D players
Senegalese expatriate footballers
Expatriate footballers in Italy
Senegalese expatriate sportspeople in Italy